Thomas Lovat (born December 28, 1938) is an American former gridiron football coach.

Lovat started coaching at his alma mater Utah as the defensive line coach in 1967.  Next he went to Idaho State University  and worked with the defensive secondary and offensive line. Then Lovat moved on to the Canadian Football League (CFL) as the defensive coordinator for the Saskatchewan Roughriders (1971), and then went back to Utah as an assistant in 1972 under {{nowrap|Bill Meek, was promoted to head coach in 1974, and lasted three seasons.

Next Lovat coached offensive line at Stanford University from 1977 to 1979 under Bill Walsh. Then he moved up to the National Football League (NFL), hired by Bart Starr of the Green Bay Packers as the assistant offensive line coach in 1980, and then to St. Louis Cardinals under Jim Hanifan from 1981 to 1984, as line coach.  Then he coached the Indianapolis Colts from 1985 to 1988; and back to the Cardinals when the team moved to Phoenix, coaching under Joe Bugel, as his line coach from 1990 to 1991. Then he was hired by new head coach Mike Holmgren with the Packers 1992, moved with him to the Seattle Seahawks in 1999, and retired after the 2003 season at age 65.

Lovat's son, Mark Lovat, is currently a strength and conditioning assistant for the Green Bay Packers.

Head coaching record

References

1938 births
Living people
American football linebackers
American football offensive guards
Cologne Centurions (NFL Europe) coaches
Green Bay Packers coaches
Idaho State Bengals football coaches
Indianapolis Colts coaches
People from Bingham Canyon, Utah
Phoenix Cardinals coaches
Players of American football from Utah
Saskatchewan Roughriders coaches
Seattle Seahawks coaches
St. Louis Cardinals (football) coaches
Stanford Cardinal football coaches
Utah Utes football coaches
Utah Utes football players